Frey Svenson (1866–1927) was a Swedish doctor and professor of psychology, born in Vetlanda, Sweden.

In the year of 1899 he worked at Upsala Hospital, which at that time was a psychiatric hospital rather than a medical hospital. Here he met the Swedish poet Gustaf Fröding. Svenson tried to help Fröding deal with his mental illness and also became his friend. This was the basis of a book called Gustaf Frödings diktning. Bidrag till dess psykologi (The poems by Gustaf Fröding. What lies beneath, published in 1916.

Svenson became a professor in psychology at Uppsala University 1904, the same school where he got his doctoral diploma.

1866 births
1927 deaths
Uppsala University alumni